Barranco de Santos is a ravine in Tenerife, Spain.

Bridges 
The ravine is crossed by a number of bridges, including:
 Galcerán Bridge, opened in 1928.
 General Serrador Bridge, opened in 1943.

References 

Geography of Tenerife